Several kings called Edward have abdicated, including:
Edward II of England
Edward VIII of the United Kingdom